Zonosaurus is a genus of lizards in the family Gerrhosauridae.

Geographic range
Species in the genus Zonosaurus are found in Madagascar and Seychelles.

Species
The following 17 species are considered to be valid.

Zonosaurus aeneus (Grandidier, 1872) – bronze girdled lizard
Zonosaurus anelanelany Raselimanana, Raxworthy & Nussbaum, 2000
Zonosaurus bemaraha Raselimanana, Raxworthy & Nussbaum, 2000
Zonosaurus boettgeri Steindachner, 1891 – Boettger's girdled lizard
Zonosaurus brygooi Lang & Böhme, 1990 – Brygoo's girdled lizard
Zonosaurus haraldmeieri Brygoo & Böhme, 1985 – green zonosaur
Zonosaurus karsteni (Grandidier, 1869) – Karsten's girdled lizard
Zonosaurus laticaudatus (Grandidier, 1869) – western girdled lizard
Zonosaurus madagascariensis (Gray, 1831) – Madagascar girdled lizard
Zonosaurus maramaintso Raselimanana, Raxworthy & Nussbaum, 2006
Zonosaurus maximus Boulenger, 1896 – southeastern girdled lizard
Zonosaurus ornatus (Gray, 1831) – ornate girdled lizard
Zonosaurus quadrilineatus (Grandidier, 1867) – four-lined girdled lizard
Zonosaurus rufipes (Boettger, 1881) – red-legged girdled lizard
Zonosaurus subunicolor (Boettger, 1881)
Zonosaurus trilineatus Angel, 1939 – three-lined girdled lizard
Zonosaurus tsingy Raselimanana, Raxworthy & Nussbaum, 2000 – tsingy plated lizard

Nota bene: A binomial authority in parentheses indicates that the species was originally described in a genus other than Zonosaurus.

References

Further reading
Boulenger GA (1887). Catalogue of the Lizards in the British Museum (Natural History). Second Edition. Volume III. ... Gerrhosauridæ, ... xii + 575 pp. + Plates I-XL. (Zonosaurus, new genus, p. 127).
Raselimanana AP, Raxworthy CJ, Nussbaum RA (2000). "A revision of the dwarf Zonosaurus Boulenger (Reptilia: Squamata: Cordylidae) from Madagascar, including descriptions of three new species". Scientific Papers, Natural History Museum, University of Kansas 18: 1–16.

 
Gerrhosauridae
Lizard genera
Taxa named by George Albert Boulenger